Palmer Township, Ohio may refer to:
Palmer Township, Putnam County, Ohio
Palmer Township, Washington County, Ohio

Ohio township disambiguation pages